Ian Peter McCombie (born 11 January 1961) is a male British racewalker and lawyer for Northern law firm Ward Hadaway.

Athletics career
McCombie competed in the men's 20 kilometres walk at the 1984 Summer Olympics and 1988 Summer Olympics.

He represented England and won a bronze medal in the 30 km walk event, at the 1986 Commonwealth Games in Edinburgh, Scotland. Four years later he represented England and won another bronze medal, at the 1990 Commonwealth Games in Auckland, New Zealand.

Captain of British Walking Team, he competed in the World Walking Championships of 1981, 1983, 1985, 1987, 1989 and 1991. McCombie also competed in three World Athletics Championships, 1983 (Helsinki), 1987 (Rome) and 1991 (Tokyo), and finishing 9th in 1987. He also won 27 British and English National Titles, including an unbeaten nine successive 10 mile Championships 1982 to 1991, multiple national record holder.

Personal life
Later was President of Leeds Law Society 2005/6 and also President Cambridge Harriers 1999/2000.

Head of Commercial Dispute Resolution at Leeds office of Ward Hadaway, one of UK’s top 75 law firms.  His recent cases include successful defence in the long-running Hillsborough Disaster prosecution (May 2021), and recovering £20.8m for Adrian Fewings MBE (September 2021 - see BBC report).

References

External links 
 
 

1961 births
Living people
Athletes (track and field) at the 1984 Summer Olympics
Athletes (track and field) at the 1988 Summer Olympics
British male racewalkers
English male racewalkers
Olympic athletes of Great Britain
Commonwealth Games bronze medallists for England
Commonwealth Games medallists in athletics
Athletes (track and field) at the 1986 Commonwealth Games
Athletes (track and field) at the 1990 Commonwealth Games
People from Whitley Bay
Sportspeople from Tyne and Wear
Medallists at the 1986 Commonwealth Games
Medallists at the 1990 Commonwealth Games